is a Japanese footballer for FC Maruyasu Okazaki.

Club career

Gamba Osaka 
Hirai was born in Tokushima, Shikoku region, and began his career playing for his local club Kamihachiman SC before moving to a higher level joining Premiere SC in 2000.

At the age of 15, he was invited to attend Gamba Osaka youth academy. After spending three years there, Hirai signed his first professional contract with Gamba on 6 December 2005. He was, along with fellow player Michihiro Yasuda, promoted to the senior squad and assigned the number 34 shirt. He made his professional debut on 9 December 2006 in the Emperor's Cup 4th round match against Sanfrecce Hiroshima. The following season, Hirai took over the number 14 shirt, previously worn by Akihiro Ienaga.

In the 2008 season, Hirai playing time increased significantly as he appeared in 8 league matches. He made his J. League debut on 27 April 2008 against Vissel Kobe coming on as a substitute in the 80th minute. After making a few substitute appearances, he made his first league start on 26 July 2008 in a 1–0 defaut Oita Trinita playing 45 minutes. Hirai scored his first professional goal on 2 July 2008 in a J. League Cup match against Yokohama F. Marinos, which proved to be the winner as Gamba won the match 1–0. During the season, he signed new five-year contract.

Hirai had arguably one of the best seasons of his career in the 2010 season. He appeared in 31 total matches scoring a career-high 20 goals. On 23 March 2010, Hirai scored first career hat-trick against Singapore Armed Forces in the AFC Champions League. He was later named Man of the match for this performance, which led to a 4–2 victory.

Albirex Niigata 
On 12 January 2012 it was announced that Hirai would be joining Albirex Niigata on loan for the 2012 season.

International career 
On 16 March 2007, Hirai received his first call-up to the Japan U-20 squad, and won his first U20 cap as a substitute against Cape Verde on 25 March.

Team honors
AFC Champions League – 2008
Emperor's Cup – 2008
Japanese Super Cup – 2007

Club career stats
Updated to 23 February 2020.

References

External links

  
 Profile at Giravanz Kitakyushu
 Profile at Avispa Fukuoka

1987 births
Living people
Association football people from Tokushima Prefecture
Japanese footballers
J1 League players
J2 League players
J3 League players
Japan Football League players
Gamba Osaka players
Albirex Niigata players
Avispa Fukuoka players
Giravanz Kitakyushu players
FC Maruyasu Okazaki players
Association football forwards